Charles Briggs may refer to:
 Charles Augustus Briggs (1841–1913), American Hebrew scholar and theologian
 Charles Frederick Briggs (1804–1877), American journalist who wrote under the name "Harry Franco"
 Charles James Briggs (1865–1941), British Major-General
 Charles L. Briggs (born 1953), American anthropologist
 Chuck Briggs (1960–2000), American punk rock guitarist
 Charles Briggs (cricketer) (1873–1949), Hampshire cricketer
 Charles Briggs (Royal Navy officer) (1858–1951), British admiral
 Charlie Briggs (actor) (1932–1985), American actor
 Charlie Briggs (baseball) (1860–1920), American baseball player
 Charlie Briggs (footballer) (1911–1993), English football goalkeeper
 Charlie Briggs (One Life to Live), fictional character
 Charles A. Briggs, Inspector General of the Central Intelligence Agency, 1982

See also
 Briggs (surname)